Ziksar (also Romanized as Zīksār; also known as Rīksār) is a village in Taher Gurab Rural District, in the Central District of Sowme'eh Sara County, Gilan Province, Iran. At the 2006 census, its population was 270, in 87 families.

References 

Populated places in Sowme'eh Sara County